Hot & Nasty: The Best of Black Oak Arkansas is a compilation album by the American Southern rock band Black Oak Arkansas. Released on 10 November 1992 by Rhino, it is the second Black Oak Arkansas compilation album produced.

Track listing

References

1992 greatest hits albums
Black Oak Arkansas albums
Rhino Entertainment compilation albums

fr:Black Oak Arkansas (album)